Austrotriton is a genus of medium-sized sea snails, a marine gastropod mollusc in the family Cymatiidae.

Species 
The genus contains the following species:
 Austrotriton bassi (Angas, 1869)
 Austrotriton epitrema (Tenison Woods, 1877)
 Austrotriton garrardi Beu, 1970
 Austrotriton mimetica (Tate, 1893)
 Austrotriton petulans  (Hedley & May, 1908)
 † Austrotriton radialis (Tate, 1888)
 Austrotriton subdistortus (Lamarck, 1822)

 Species brought into synonymy
 † Austrotriton cyphoides Finlay, 1924: synonym of † Sassia cyphoides (Finlay, 1924) 
 † Austrotriton maorium Finlay, 1924: synonym of † Sassia minima (Hutton, 1873) 
 † Austrotriton morgani Marwick, 1931: synonym of † Sassia tortirostris (Tate, 1888) 
 † Austrotriton neozelanica P. Marshall & Murdoch, 1923: synonym of † Sassia neozelanica (P. Marshall & R. Murdoch, 1923) 
 Austrotriton parkinsonius (Perry, 1811): synonym of Austrosassia parkinsonia (Perry, 1811)

References

 Wenz (W.), 1941 Handbuch der Paläozoologie. Gastropoda, 6., p. 961-1200

Further reading 
 Cossmann, M. (1903). Essais de paléoconchologie comparée. Cinquième livraison. Paris, The author and de Rudeval. 215 pp., 9 pls
 Powell A W B, New Zealand Mollusca, William Collins Publishers Ltd, Auckland, New Zealand 1979 
 Strong E.E., Puillandre N., Beu A.G., Castelin M. & Bouchet P. (2019). Frogs and tuns and tritons – A molecular phylogeny and revised family classification of the predatory gastropod superfamily Tonnoidea (Caenogastropoda). Molecular Phylogenetics and Evolution. 130: 18-34

Cymatiidae